John McColl may refer to:

 John McColl (British Army officer) (born 1952), British Army officer and Lieutenant Governor of Jersey
 John McColl (politician) (1875–1933), politician and member of the Legislative Assembly of Alberta
 John B. McColl (Canadian politician) (1861–1940), Canadian politician, member of the Canadian Parliament
 John B. McColl (California politician), served in the California legislature